This is a list of characters for the manga series Magi: The Labyrinth of Magic, written and illustrated by Shinobu Ohtaka, and the prequel, Adventure of Sinbad, written by Ohtaka and illustrated Yoshifumi Ohtera. Both stories borrow elements and character names from the One Thousand and One Nights.

The Magi series has an extensive fictional cast. The Labyrinth of Magic focuses on a Magi (a rare class of magicians) named Aladdin and his King Vessel (a Magi’s chosen one), Alibaba Saluja. They both travel through a world full of magic, which contain mysterious dungeons full of Djinns, treasures, metal vessels, vast countries, various mysteries, and pasts to be unfolded. The prequel, Adventure of Sinbad, focuses on Sinbad and his early life where he captures his seven dungeons, the start of his trading company, the creation of Sindria, and recruiting his Eight Generals.

Main characters

 Aladdin is a mysterious young boy with a huge djinn within his flute named Ugo. He travels in search of metal vessels that contain other djinns to find similar beings like Ugo. Aladdin enters the world with a pure and innocent, yet a wise and optimistic personality that dislikes fighting. Unknown to him early on, he has been sent to earth in order to stop a tragedy that will corrupt and destroy the world. Although a child, Aladdin loves to bury his face on the breasts of the beautiful ladies he meets, the larger the better. Known as a 'Magi' (a wizard of creation), he is able to gather unlimited Magoi, (unlike normal magicians), provided from the Rukh to power his magic. He also loves to eat a lot, far more than the amount of an average boy his age, and has a tendency to “steal” sometimes in order to satisfy his hunger. Aladdin is considered special among the other Magi because in all of history, there were only three living Magi at the same time, but for the first time, a fourth Magi (Aladdin) appears while the other three are still alive, and later it is revealed that he is the son of king Soloman. He also has the ability to materialize the djinn 'Ugo' that lies within his flute, though he has only his body. The flute is also the main cause of Aladdin’s hunger, as it uses magoi from Aladdin. In addition, he has a magical turban that when unwrapped, acts as a magic carpet. He enters the earth with Ugo and upon his arrival, he makes his first human friend, meeting Alibaba Saluja, whom he chooses as his kings candidate, not to become the ruler of a single nation unlike Sinbad, but to help him inspire others with his kindness, optimism, and leadership. Aladdin helps Alibaba in his conquest to capture the dungeon Amon and helps free Morgiana, a former slave of the king of Qishan, Jamil. The Wisdom of Soloman allows Aladdin to contact the souls of the dead that lie within the guidance of Rukh, which later he perfects to grant him their knowledge as well as learning magic from the past. Aladdin does not know much about his identity and the world he was sent to. He encounters another Magi in Balbadd, Judar, but this Magi had dark Rukh, the opposite of white Rukh, which implies that the person has cursed his fate. After helping Alibaba in Balbadd by helping defeating Judar and Alibaba’s adopted brother Cassim, he sets off with him and Morgiana Kingdom of Sindria, where he learns more about magic with the court magician and one of the eight generals, Yamraiha. He meet Hakuryuu Ren and helps him along with Alibaba and Morgiana, to capture the dungeon of Zagan, where they encounter Al-Thamen members, Ithnan, Dunya, and Isaac. Aladdin and everyone defeat them, and after returning to Sindria, he comforts Dunya in her final moments and reveals that he is going to go on a journey to further study at Magnostadt's magic academy by disguised as a normal magician, while taking the opportunity to investigate its connection with Al-Thamen. During his stay at Magnostadt, as Magnostadt is being invaded by the Reim Empire, Aladdin joins the fight to put an end to the conflict, making use of his newfound experience combined with his abilities as a Magi to repel the invaders while protecting both friend and foe from harm. Although it seems as if Aladdin is supporting Magnostadt, he simply does not want conflict rather a peaceful solution, and disagrees on the ties of Magnostadt to Al-Thamen. Aladdin along with many king vessels and dungeon capturers, witness the power of the medium; summoned by Matal Mogammet who resorted to summoning black djinns to defend his country from Reim, unintentionally helping Al-Thamen. After the medium gets stopped, Aladdin gets claimed by Kouen who bring up his Aladdin’s promise that he will tell him all about the past and the other world, Alma Torran. Once reunited with Alibaba, Aladdin finally reveals his true mission to destroy Al-Thamen Aladdin joins the summit held by many empires and Alliances, and he reveals the tragedy of Alma-Torran, mankind's original world whose survivors were transferred to the current world by Ugo. Aladdin is suddenly interrupted by a fallen Hakuryuu who created a civil war in the Kou Empire. He fights Judar, his Magi, and wins, but loses Alibaba as he was killed by Hakuryuu. Aladdin, now upset about losing his friend, but has resolve to try and find a way to revive Alibaba and still stop Al-Thamen. After fighting against Gyokuen and Sinbad, Aladdin vanishes without a trace, until Alibaba returns to the world of the living and upon contacting his longtime friend, it is revealed that he took refuge in the Dark Continent with Morgiana and Hakuryuu, and the three reunite with Alibaba after returning from there. Aladdin along with Alibaba, Judar, and Hakuryuu, all join forces to stop Sinbad, after he rewrote the Rukh of all people. After facing trials of the dungeons that Sinbad gave, David reveals himself and takes over the sacred palace. Aladdin along with Yunan attempt to Aladdin kill him, and manage to do so after Sinbad sacrifices himself to accomplish this. Aladdin is a main protagonist with Alibaba of Magi and is a minor character in Adventure of Sinbad, making a brief appearance at the end.

 Alibaba Saluja is an ambitious young man. Although he was originally from the slums, after his mother died, he was taken in by his father, Balbadd's King, as the third prince. Whenever possible, he began to study languages, economics, sword play, and more in order to learn how to become a good ruler. Hence, his forte was in Balbadd's Royal Sword Play. However, his bed-ridden father died after an incident involving him and his childhood friend Cassim, who put Balbadd’s palace on fire. Feeling responsible for it, he left Balbadd. Upon meeting Aladdin in the city of Qishan, he captures the 7th Dungeon, "Amon" with his help. With the treasures acquired from it, he became the lord of Qishan after defeating the former king Jamil and frees all of the slaves he owned, including Morgiana. He returns to Balbadd after having no news of Aladdin, where he joins the Fog Troupe, a band of Robin Hood-esque thieves armed with magic tools started by Cassim. Alibaba, now as "The Wonder Man Alibaba" wants to stop the tyrannical rule of his older brother, King Abhmad. With help from Aladdin and his friends, Alibaba finds a pacifistic solution by having the monarchy dissolved and making the country into a republic, despite losing its sovereignty to the Kou Empire. Since then he trains swordsmanship with Sinbad's general Sharrkan before setting to the Reim Empire's colosseum to learn to control his Magoi with the Yambala Gladiators and unlock the full power of Amon. Upon arriving there, Alibaba learns that the Magoi in his body is in disarray because of Cassim's Magoi that somehow got inside him, interfering with his own Magoi, allowing him to upgrade his powers when he properly fuses the two Magoi into one single entity. Alibaba's training helped him to complete his Djinn equip and perfect his skills to the point of fighting on par with Mu Alexius, who is considered the greatest warrior in Reim. Upon learning about the impending war on Magnostadt, Alibaba decides to reunite with Aladdin, who is studying there, appearing in the nick of time to stop Mu from destroying the entire city with his Djinn, and later, assists Kouha Ren and his army against Mogamett's Dark Djinns. Once the Black Rukh medium is unleashed, Alibaba joins the other Dungeon Capturers from Kou and Reim, along Sinbad and his fellow allies to fight it. After returning to Sindria, Alibaba is summoned by Kouen Ren to meet him and Aladdin in Balbadd, but doubting of his intentions, he decides to depart there by himself, accompanied by Morgiana and some other friends against his will. In the occasion, his friends Olba and Toto also become members of his household. As a consequence of a fight against Hakuryuu, Alibaba's soul is sent to another world while his body stayed in the mortal world under Yunan's care during three years until his body and soul merged again and he is brought back to life. In the occasion, he learns a special ability that gives him unparalleled reflexes. As of current, Alibaba meets Sinbad in the new world 3 years after his apparent death, seemingly to check if Sinbad was himself or if he was being controlled. Consequently, he heads towards the Kou Empire, now in a dire economic crisis, in search of clues to the whereabouts of Aladdin and Morgiana. There he finds out that Hakuryuu has stepped down from the throne and is missing. With Ren Kougyoku crowned as the new empress of the Kou Empire, Alibaba joins forces with her to prevent the Kou Empire from going bankrupt, but his efforts so far are being hindered by no other than Sinbad himself, who intends to have the Kou Empire ruined in order to force it to join the International Alliance, but accepts his challenge head on, later reuniting with Aladdin, Hakuryuu and Morgiana, who were in the Dark Continent. After realizing what Sinbad has done to the world by rewriting the Rukh and brainwashing them, he confronts Sinbad along with Aladdin, Judar, and Hakuryuu. Alibaba fights Sinbad and the trials of the seven dungeons he has given them. Afterwards, he manages to convince Sinbad a proper way to converge dimensions vertically and horizontally. However, David appears and takes over the sacred palace, also bringing himself to the world to destroy everything. Alibaba using everything he has attempts to stop him as much as possible, but as things get worse, they become even worse once the allies of Alibaba from all over the world join David to fight against him (due to their Rukh being rewritten). With all he has, he fights the world alone until finally, the spell gets rewritten. Alibaba and his allies start targeting the dungeons that have once reappeared again. After David finally gets killed by Sinbad, the world is at peace. Alibaba proposes to Morgiana, and marries her. In the bonus manga of the final volume, Alibaba is seen going on another adventure with Aladdin, dragging Judar with him to the dark continent. Alibaba is the main protagonist of Magi. He is also a minor character in Adventure of Sinbad, making brief appearances in some panels.
Amon

 A djinn of politeness and austerity, appearing in the form of a muscular, bearded old man with an intimidating air with fire elemental powers. Originally contained in Alibaba's training sword which was given to him by his father who visited the slums. After its destruction, he is transferred to a royal sword which was originally a presented from his father, Rashid, to Sinbad. It empowers a household vessel used by Morgiana, that must be used only in emergencies, as for being a Fanalis, her body possess little Magoi to spend, possibly because most of it is used to sustain her strong body. Toto and Olba later have their weapons turned into household vessels as well, when they decide to support Alibaba in the journey to Balbadd in the second Balbadd arc.

 Descendant of the hunting tribe 'Fanalis', a red-haired girl who became emotionless and unfriendly due to her life as a slave, eventually opening herself to others after obtaining freedom. Although she looks like a normal girl, as a Fanalian she possesses a superhuman strength, speed and senses, able to carry several people at the same time, jump dozens of times her height and defeat opponents far larger than her with powerful kicks. Originally grateful to them for freeing her, Morgiana develops a deep friendship with Aladdin and Alibaba, desiring to protect them from harm with her massive strength, thus training combat with Sinbad's general and fellow Fanalian Masrur. Later she obtains the household item "Amol Selseira", a magical pair of bracers infused with Amon's power created from the same legcuffs she used during her times of slavery, which can extend its chains to increase her reach. She also appears to have a crush on Alibaba, usually getting angry when she feels neglected by him. When Aladdin and Alibaba decide to take separate ways to improve themselves, Morgiana departs to Dark Continent to meet the people of her homeland, but is disencouraged by Yunan when he informs her that she may not return. However. Thanks to his advice, she learns to control her vessel more effectively and later returns to her friends side to help them in Magnostadt. Once Alibaba is summoned to meet Kouen in Balbadd, she accompanies him there despite his will to go alone. After Aladdin disappears to the Dark Continent, Morgiana accompanies him as well, where she finally realizes her dream of meeting her fellow Fanalis, but retains her human form thanks to Aladdin's magic. After returning from the Dark Continent, Morgiana reunites with Alibaba. She unfortunately is a victim of the brain washing done by Sinbad, and upsets Alibaba after she says that she wants everything to become Rukh again. She later helps Alibaba at the end, and after the death of David, Morgiana accepts Alibaba’s marriage proposal. Morgiana is the lead heroine of Magi. She is also a minor character in Adventure of Sinbad, making a brief appearance at the end.

Alliance of Seven Seas
Several small nations united by a couple of multilateral treaties including a mutual protection agreement. After the battle of Magnostadt, the Alliance joins forces with the Reim Empire, and helps Hakuryuu's faction win against Kouen's during the Kou Empire Civil War, earning their support as well, effectively establishing ties of trust with all the world's major powers, leading to the foundation of the "International Alliance", which spans almost every nation in the world, and abolishes slavery, conscription, as well as adopting a single currency and allowing its citizens to travel freely inside its territory.

Sindria Kingdom
, or rather the Second Kingdom of Sindria, is an island country located in the southern seas. Its realms lie in extreme south of the region that northern mapmakers had labeled 'uncivilized'. These islands were isolated until King Sinbad developed them. The 'City of Dreams' has become known around the world as home of the 'Legendary Dungeon Capturer' attracts many visitors. The islands teem with people, animals and plants not seen in the northern continents due to their unusual topography and climates. As a result, the country has become prosperous through trade and tourism. It was established after the original Kingdom of Sindria established by Sinbad and his companions was invaded and destroyed by Parthevia.

 He is the King of Sindria and the leader of the Alliance of the Seven Seas. Born in the Parthevia Empire, Sinbad was 14 years old when he first captured a dungeon, the dungeon 'Baal'. Afterwards, he sailed the seven seas and captured six more dungeons, becoming known as the 'Legendary Dungeon Capturer' and the master of seven djinn. At least one of the djinn he obtained came from a dungeon created by Judar and was conquered without his permission, as part of his intention to stop Al-Thamen's plans. Because he has mastered so many djinn, Sinbad and his retainers are forbidden from entering in any more dungeons by the other djinn. He meets Aladdin and his friends in Balbadd while trying to reestablish trade. After helping them save the country, he takes the three companions to Sindria under his protection to join his cause. Trained in Magoi manipulation by the Yambala Gladiators, he once absorbed the Black Rukh of thousands of fellow Parthevians who fell into depravity, but despite half of his body ends up corrupted, oddly he does not exhibit any of the expected symptoms of one with such condition. Some of his old acquaintances, like Yunan, are wary of his real intentions as he is never truly honest about his plans with his allies. His household is composed of eight powerful warriors he met and befriended during his travels known as the "Eight Generals of Sindria". Later it is revealed that his body contains the Rukh of David, the founder of the Orthodox Magician cult that once ruled the ancient world of Alma Torran and Aladdin's grandfather. Sinbad is the lead protagonist in Adventure of Sinbad.  
Baal

A djinn of wrath and heroes, Baal was the first djinn captured by Sinbad. With the power to control lightning, it is contained within a small sword which belonged to his father and also empowers Ja'far, Masrur, Mistoras and Drakon's household vessels.
Valefor

A djinn of falsehood and prestige. With the power to control ice, Valefor was the second djinn captured by Sinbad. Entering the dungeon to rescue Hinahoho at first, Sinbad ends up into a multi-side battle for the Djinn's ownership against Hinahoho, Drakon and Ja'far, winning when he uses his wits against them. It is contained in a necklace Sinbad received from him. It also empowers Hinahoho's household vessel.
Zepar
A djinn of spirit and puppetry, Zepar was originally captured by Serendine, and transferred to Sinbad when he absorbed her Rukh following her death. When fully equipped, this djinn gives Sinbad a diminute, imp-like appearance, whose huge shout can force everyone who hears it under his permanent control. It is contained within his ring and also empowers Pisti's household vessel.
Furfur
A djinn of madness and melancholy, Furfur is Sinbad's fourth Djinn, who gives him bat-like wings and magic strong enough to break through magical forcefields.
Focalor
A djinn of rule and submission, Focalor is Sinbad's fifth Djinn. With the power to invoke tornadoes, it is contained within a silver bracelet he wears in Sinbad's right wrist and also empowers Sharrkan's household vessel
Vepar
Vepar is Sinbad's sixth djinn who gives him a merman-like form, whose extreme magic, "Vepar Isuterraha", rains down hundreds of magic swords upon the enemy.
Crocell
Contained within Sinbad's long sword, Crocell is Sinbad's seventh and final Djinn, who gives him an animalistic form, capable of dealing fast and powerful attacks.

Eight Generals of Sindria

  Formerly the leader of a clan of assassins hired to kill Sinbad, his loyalty towards him is so high that he will approach with a murderous intent anyone who insults him, although he is usually worried by Sinbad's antics. He usually only wears official clothing as he only has one set of normal clothing he received from Sinbad when he was 14, which he has since outgrown. He uses the weapon household's vessel 'Valalark Sei' created from one of his killing tools from his former trade, making of him the first Household Member of Sinbad's court. Unlike the other generals who return to their home countries after the establishment of the International Alliance, Ja'far stays by Sinbad's side as his personal assistant.

 One of the Imuchak Warriors of the Extreme North's Unexplored Region. When he first meets Sinbad, he still had not a name as he was struggling to complete his ceremony of age. Sinbad helps him to complete the ceremony, but ashamed for failing to do so by himself, Hinahoho enters the dungeon Valefor to prove his worth and is almost killed when Sinbad steps in to save him. After Sinbad claims Valefor, Hinahoho becomes his comrade, and helps him found his trading company. His lance eventually becomes the household vessel 'Galfor Roromus'. After the establishment of the International Alliance, Hinahoho assumes Rametoto's place as the king of Imuchak and becomes a grandfather.

 A Fanalis like Morgiana who becomes her trainer in hand to hand combat, Sinbad first met him as one of Maader's slaves, helping him to obtain freedom before he joins his side. He does not speak a lot usually and is seen as emotionless and unfriendly, but his behavior sometimes shows the opposite. Although he is given a private room, he is often seen outside. He uses the weapon household's vessel 'Balalark Kauza'. After the establishment of the International Alliance, Masrur leaves Sindria and settles in Reim.

 A sorceress from Magnostadt specialized in water magic. She takes Aladdin as her apprentice by Sinbad's request. Because of her fondness and pride for magic, she often gets into fights with Sharrkan, who takes more pride on his swordsmanship. Because she will become so nervous that she will only talk about topics regarding magic with the person she is interested in, Pisti suggested her to 'just date a guy who can use magic'. Yamraiha is the adopted daughter of Matal Mogamett, and leaves his side upon disagreeing with his methods, eventually meeting Sinbad and helping him to control the excess of Magoi in his body. She eventually reconciles with her foster father just before he dies thanks to Aladdin's help. Unlike the other generals, she does not use a household vessel as its powers usually interfere with her magic. After the establishment of the International Alliance, Yamraiha returns to Magnostadt and assumes Mogamett's place as the Headmaster.

 An exiled prince from Heliohapt's royal family, Sharrkan is the swordsman of the group, becoming Alibaba's teacher upon Sinbad's request. His optimistic personality changes into a violent personality during sword practice. Because of his extreme fondness for fencing, he often gets into fights with Yamuraiha who claims that magic is far more useful. After the establishment of the International Alliance, Sharrkan assumes his brother's place as the king of Heliohapt.

He is a former general and noble of the Parthevia Empire and was the first of the generals who met him, as he was drafting him to join his expedition to conquer Baal. Owner of the household vessel 'Balalark Barasheekh', he turns into a dragon-like creature after being mortally wounded by his brother, suffering a process called "Assimilation", that allows a Household Member to bring out the full power of his vessel, but losing his human form in the process. After the establishment of the International Alliance, Drakon assumes Sinbad's place as the king of Sindria.

 The youngest daughter of the queen of Artemyra. Despite being 18 years old, she looks much younger, and has a complex about her child-like body. Her only female friend is Yamraiha. Although she is good at pretending to cry, she says it no longer works on Ja'far. Her special skills include communicating with and charming animals using her music. After the establishment of the International Alliance, Pisti assumes her mother's place as the queen of Artemyra.

 Originally a prince from Sasan, he fights using a lance. He is the younger brother of Mystras, another member of Sinbad's household who was killed in the war against Parthevia, and joined the generals after his death. After the establishment of the International Alliance, Spartos assumes his father's place as the king of Sasan.

Prince of Sasan and Spartos' older brother. Inspired by Sinbad's stories and eager to see the outside world, he refused to follow his father's footsteps and was sentenced to fight the country's knights one on one to earn his freedom, but after defeating all his comrades, he is forced to fight his own father in a bout to the death. After Sinbad saves him and defeats his father, he starts traveling the world with Sinbad and company. His lance eventually becomes the household vessel 'Bararaq Harba'. He is killed when Parthevia invades and destroys the original Kingdom of Sindria, and Spartos assumes his place as Sinbad's comrade in his honor.

Imuchak

The Imuchak Warriors' Clan Chief and Hinahoho's father-in-law, he owns the Djinn Forneus. He becomes Sinbad's first business partner and ally in the creation of his company. He later relinquishes his title to Hinahoho and joins the board of directors of the International Alliance

Rametoto's daughter and Hinahoho's wife, she is as strong and muscular as her husband and has several children with him. While being one of Sinbad's retainers, she was a strict teacher to him and Ja'far, handling with their education on mathematics, language, geography and etiquette among other subjects. She is killed when Parthevia invades and destroys the original Kingdom of Sindria.

Hinahoho's little sister. She and her brother first meet Sinbad when they are struggling to complete his ceremony of age. After the establishment of the International Alliance, she becomes Ja'far's secretary.

Sasan

The Knight King of Sasan, He is Spartos and Mystras' father. While at first he wanted to keep his country away from the influence of the outside world, after being defeated by Sinbad and understanding that the power of the Djinns is not unique, he agreed on letting Mystras travel with Sinbad, also becoming his ally. He later relinquishes the throne to Spartos and joins the board of directors of the International Alliance.
Alloces
Darius' Djinn capable of reflecting enemy attacks back to them. It is contained within his spear.

Heliohapt

 Sphintus is a student at the Magnostadt Academy and Aladdin's roommate. He is originally from Heliohapt, and a member of its Royal Family, like Sharrkan. He specializes in Healing Magic.

King of Heliohapt and Sharrkan's older brother, he owns the Djinn Vassago. He later relinquishes the throne to his younger brother and joins the board of directors of the International Alliance.

Artemyra

Queen of Artemyra and Pisti's mother, she is very suspicious of men and sentences Sinbad and his friends to death for his attempt to hit on her. He later reappears to reclaim his metal vessels and she challenges him to a fight. After being defeated, Mira decides to join forces with Sinbad and agrees to open business with his company. She later relinquishes the throne to Pisti and joins the board of directors of the International Alliance
Cerberus
Djinn of severity and fascination that turns her into a three headed warrior capable of controlling lightning, ice and fire.

Kina

King of Kina and a dungeon capturer as well, he first appears to provide aid to Hakuryuu's army in the Kou Civil War. One of the dissidents who disagrees with the idea of establishing the International Alliance, he disappears with his entire nation to the Dark Continent, with help from the powers of Hakuryuu's Zagan.
Caim
A Djinn of attention and sharpness that allows Yamato to strike his enemies precisely from a huge distance.

Yamato's aid and his contact with Hakuryuu.

Kou Empire
The  was originally a small, fragmented country in the Far East that grew to the central plains into a powerful nation which intends to conquer the entire world. Their method of expansion involves sending dungeon capturers to invade bordering countries. Its history, culture, and architecture resembles those of early Imperial China. Following a civil war after Empress Gyokuen is murdered, the Kou Empire declines in power once the International Alliance is established, as it could not cope neither with the abolishment of slavery nor with the competition with other nations in trade and tourism.

Royal Family

 The fourth prince in the Kou Empire, distinguished by a large burn scar around his left eye which he received in the fire that claimed the life of his family with the exception of himself, his mother and Hakuei. He harbors a deep hatred for his mother who plotted with his uncle to usurp the throne. Taught to be reliable and independent by his sister, Hakuryuu is a good cook. He befriends Aladdin's group when they were all Sinbad's guests in Sindria. They conquered a dungeon together and he obtained his own djinn equipment but lost his left hand in the process. In the manga Hakuryuu loses his hand when it becomes corrupted after Ithnan's snake form bites him; in the anime Isaac severed the hand while protecting Alibaba from him. Hakuryuu eventually falls in love with Morgiana and promises to return when he is a man worthy of asking for her hand in marriage. Upon returning to the Empire, Hakuryuu confronts his mother just to be defeated by her and joins forces with Judar seeking to destroy Al-Thamen and enact revenge upon his mother. Some time later, Hakuryuu conquers his second dungeon, becoming the fourth Dungeon Capturer with more than one djinn and uses its power to seize the throne, igniting a civil war between the members of the Imperial family. After Judar and Hakuryuu conquer the capital and apparently kill Gyokuen, Hakuryuu conquers the entire Kou Empire after defeating Kouen and his brothers with Sinbad and the Alliance of Seven Seas' help. In the battle, Hakuryuu's two legs are destroyed out of Magoi exhaustion, but all of his limbs are restored by Kouen as a parting gift for sparing his brothers. However, after failing to quell a series of rebellions in the Empire, Hakuryuu abdicates in favor of his sister Kōgyoku. However, as he did not surrender his metal vessels by order of the International Alliance, he is considered a dangerous runaway along other king vessels who refused to so as well, like Yamato Takeruhiko, the king of Kina and Nerva Julius, the former heir of the Reim Empire. Hakuryuu later rejoins Aladdin and Morgiana, retreating to the Dark Continent at first, but later returning after getting stronger to confront Arba and stop her plans.

A djinn of loyalty and purity. With the power to control earth and life, he is contained within Hakuryuu's spear. With Zagan's power, Hakuryuu replaced his severed hand with one having plant features and subdues several monsters to serve as his personal army.
Belial
A djinn of truth and conviction. With the power to control other beings by producing illusions, he attempts to have both Judar and Hakuryuu reform by having them confront and overcome their anger and resentment, but fails when the prince also falls into depravity instead and conquers the dungeon by force. It is contained within Hakuryuu's left shoulder guard. Having similar magic properties as Zagan's, Belial's power can be used in tandem with them to create new abilities never seen before, manifesting itself as a scythe when equipped.

 Hakuryuu's elder sister. She is the first princess of the Kou Empire and general of the western army but is not seen as reliable by some of the family because of her pacifist personality. She is conflicted by her position as leader of an army meant for war and the fact that she wants to settle things peacefully. Having conquered a dungeon, Hakuei is brave, a competent warrior and has a strong will. While serving as Hakuryuu's surrogate mother, Hakuei taught him to be independent and reliable, to the point of having him learning to do his own cooking and house chores. Hakuei is last seen asking for Sinbad's help to assist Hakuryuu in the Kou Civil War, but once the war ends, it is revealed that her body is possessed by Arba's rukh. However, Hakuei's body is freed from Arba's control by Aladdin, who uses alchemical magic to deconstruct and recompose her in a slightly different way so that she could not be used as a vessel, as Arba can only possess the bodies of her descendants, expelling her mother's rukh from her.
Paimon

A djinn of fertility and chaos. She is contained within Hakuei's Flabellum and has the power to control wind. She also empowers the household vessels of Seishun Ri and a hundred of her cavalry vassals of the Kouga Clan, whose peaceful annexation Hakuei arranged with Aladdin's help.

The Kou Empire's eighth Princess. She is antagonistic at first but Alibaba grows on her during her stay in Sindria and he becomes her first friend. Despite promising Sinbad that she would not use her power against Sindria, Kougyoku fears that she will not be able to stop her siblings from invading. She falls in love with Sinbad at first sight, but this love turns into hatred when she is forced by him to betray her brothers and join Hakuryuu's united Kou Empire. She becomes the 5th Empress of the Kou Empire after Hakuryuu relinquishes the throne and has a hard time leading the country in difficulties, until Alibaba appears to help her.
Vinea
 A djinn of sorrow and isolation with the power to control water. It is contained within Kougyoku's hair ornament and empowers Koubun Ka's household vessel.

 The Kou Empire's first Prince and its strongest general. Kouen, having three Djinn under his command, is the only person besides Sinbad, Hakuryuu and Barbarossa to have conquered more than one Dungeon. Kouen desires to bring peace to the world by uniting it under his rule and wants his siblings to help him, but doesn't want to force them to do so. His household is composed of four powerful Dungeon monsters that act as his commanders. Later, he reveals to Aladdin that his true intention is to unveil the secrets of the world and his efforts to conquer it are only a means to achieve that. Once the Kou Empire is split following Gyokuen's death, he leads his own faction contending with Hakuryuu's for the throne, but is ultimately defeated when the Alliance of Seven Seas joins the enemy side. However, out of sympathy for having his siblings spared, Kouen uses his magic to replace Hakuryuu's destroyed limbs with his own's, before he is banished from the Empire, while in the official records, he was decapitated in a staged execution.
Astaroth

A Djinn of terror and meditation. Just like Amon, it is capable of powerful fire magic. Its extreme magic creates flames that keep burning the enemy long after ignition. It empowers Seishuu Ri's household vessel.
Phenex

A Djinn of kindness and mediation, capable of healing magic, which he uses to restore Hakuryuu's lost limbs in exchange of his. It is contained within Kouen's sword and empowers Kin Gaku's household vessel.
Agares

Kouen's Djinn who empowers Kokuton Shu's household vessel.

The Kou Empire's second Prince and one of the three Generals. He becomes governor of Balbadd after its annexation, but is banished with Kouen and Kouha following their faction's defeat in the Kou Civil War, until he is brought back to Kou by Alibaba as part of his plan to restore the Empire's finances, under Sinbad's condition that his identity should not be revealed to the public.
Dantalion
Koumei's Djinn specialized in spatial magic. It uses its teleporting powers to attack enemy blind spots or to make legions of enemies clash against each other. Each Gate opened by Dantalion bears a crest resembling the Big Dipper.

The Kou Empire's third Prince, he's a General and Dungeon Capturer like his older brothers. With an androgynous appearance, he has a vicious and sadistic demeanor in battle, slaughtering his enemies without mercy. Aladdin meets him first during his travel to Magnostadt as the prince is sent as an envoy to convince Mogamett to surrender the country to the Empire. His household is composed of outcasts from society, like people disfigured by failed experiments, members from disgraced clans and former criminals. His lack of prejudice toward those who would never be accepted by anyone else, even at the cost of being scorned by most of the royal court earned him the unyielding respect and devotion from his followers, including his Djinn. Following Reim's failed invasion of Magnostadt, Kouha takes the opportunity to occupy the city while their forces are still recovering, just to be repelled by Mogamett's Dark Djinns and saved in the nick of time by Alibaba and later assisted by his brother Kouen. He is banished with Kouen and Koumei following their faction's defeat in the Kou Civil War.
Leraje

Kouha's Djinn whose dungeon was conquered with Kouen's help. With a flamboyant attitude, she is contained within his large sword, which becomes a scythe when fully equipped. Its extreme magic, "Lerazzo Madraga" can crush enemies flat in a huge area.

 The first Emperor and founder of the Kou Empire who united smaller warring states into a single nation. He is the father of Hakuei and Hakuryuu and two other sons who died in a fire with him under strange circumstances. According to Hakuryuu, his death was orchestrated by his wife, Gyokuen, with the help of Al-Thamen.

 The second emperor of the Kou Empire who assumed the throne after the death of his brother Hakutoku and then married his former empress, Gyokuen. He is the father of Kouen, Koumei, Kouha and Kougyoku. He officially named his wife to succeed him on his deathbed, a move seen as suspicious by some members of the Royal court.

Household Members

Hakuei's old acquaintance and assistant who had captured a dungeon with her. His household's vessel is 'Double Moon Swords'. He gets along well with Hakuryuu and trains with him. He is annoyed that Hakuryuu grew taller than him.

 Kougyoku's assistant who has accompanied her since they were young. He is a cunning individual who planned to take control of Balbadd by manipulating the heir to the throne that would be born from the princess' marriage with King Abhmad. When that marriage fell through, he later planned to create a scandal involving Kougyoku and Sinbad and so force their marriage, but this scheme was foiled when Yamraiha proved Sinbad's innocence. Despite his machinations Kougyoku forgave him and allowed him to remain in her household. His household vessel allows him to heal others with water magic.

Balbadd
A coastal nation set close to the Kou Empire, the Reim Empire and the Sindria Kingdom. Its strategic position and culture share many similarities with its real world counterpart, the Ancient Middle-East. A monarchy ruled Balbadd for 23 generations before it was dissolved and the country was annexed by the Kou Empire. When the Kou Empire was split in two by Hakuryuu's rebellion, Balbadd was promoted to capital of the Western Kou Empire, serving as Kouen and his forces' base of operations, until it is conquered by the Alliance of Seven Seas. After the establishment of the International Alliance, Balbadd finally earned back its independence and turned into a parliamentary republic.

 Alibaba's father and the 22nd king of Balbadd who died soon after appointing Alibaba as his successor. He was also a friend of Sinbad and sponsored a number of his endeavors once he found him to be reliable. He once presented a valuable sword to Sinbad, who in return passed on to Alibaba to serve as Amon's current metal vessel.

 The 23rd king of Balbadd and Alibaba's half-brother. His gullible nature and lack of political acumen allows the Kou Empire to easily manipulate him. His bad management leaves Balbadd heavily indebted to the Empire and, in a last effort to save the country's economy, and since he thinks of most of his citizens as trash, he decides to establish a slave market in Balbadd where the people of the slums are to be sold to other countries. After the monarchy is dissolved, both Abhmad and his brother Sahbmad are given asylum at Sinbad's request and become researchers of the ancient Torran language and culture.

 Alibaba's other half-brother and the viceroy of Balbadd. Upon learning of his older brother's plan to sell the people as slaves, Sahbmad takes a stand and joins Alibaba's effort to stop him.

 Alibaba's mother. Before she became a harlot, Anise was a maid in Balbadd Palace, where she caught the king's eye and conceived Alibaba. The circumstances of her fall from the palace to the slums are not revealed, but she was happy with her life looking after her son. She took Cassim and his sister in after the death of their father and upon her death, Alibaba was taken to the palace by his father.

 The de facto leader of the  who introduces Alibaba as a figurehead to gather support from the people due to his royal lineage. He uses the magical weapon 'Sword of the Black Binding Fog'. He and Alibaba grew up together in the slums and were almost like brothers. Cassim and his younger sister, Mariam, were taken in Alibaba's mother upon the death of his parents. Later it is revealed that Cassim killed his father to protect his sister, and curses himself for being the son of the man he despises most. He hid the fact that his sister died in an epidemic that swept the slums a year after he was taken into the palace from Alibaba when he snuck out one night three years later. Cassim used Alibaba's knowledge of the tunnels to rob the royal treasury, which brought about the already-frail king's death. When Alibaba returns to Balbadd, Cassim manipulates him into joining the Fog Troupe. When Alibaba comes with a peaceful solution for the conflict in Balbadd, he does not agree with the idea and incites a rebellion instead. By using a black metal vessel, Kassim transforms himself in a dark djinn that is only stopped when Aladdin uses Solomon's Wisdom to allow Cassim and Alibaba to communicate and reconcile in spirit. However, the transformation culminates with Cassim's death and his Magoi transfers to Alibaba.

 One of the cadre of the 'Fog Troupe'. She uses the magical weapon 'Sword of the Scarlet Delusional Fog'. Later she marries Hassan and has a child with him.

 One of the cadre of the 'Fog Troupe'. He wears a patch over his left eye and uses the weapon 'Sword of the Yellow Corrosive Fog'. He later becomes Zaynab's husband.

Reim Empire
Having many similarities with the historical Roman Empire and extending for most of the western territory, it is one of the two most powerful nations in the world, the other being the Kou Empire, both aiming for global domination. Once the International Alliance is established, the Reim Empire opts to not join it, but adopts some of its policies, like the abolishment of slavery.

 A Magi who is the High Priestess of the Reim Empire. She is more than 250 years old and is responsible for the empire's rise in power when she chose Pernadius Alexius, who became the first emperor, as her King Vessel. Believed to have the appearance of a young woman, later it is revealed that it is just a clone of hers created to act as her proxy. Her true, aged body lies dormant and concealed in an unknown location, with little time left to live. She sacrifices herself to replenish the Magoi of Alibaba and the Kou Empire's royal family, allowing them to take part in a combined effort to weaken the Black Rukh in Magnostadt and allow Aladdin to dispel it with Solomon's Wisdom. After the battle, her spirit chooses Titus to become her successor as the Reim Empire's Magi, allowing him to reincarnate in her stead, while inheriting all her powers and knowledge.

 A clone created by Scheherazade through a sample of her body, he is sent to infiltrate Magnostadt disguised as a student who befriends Aladdin, Sphintus and Marga. When Mogamett learns of his identity, he refuses to give him back to Scheherazade as he considers him more than a clone, but also a fellow magician, giving an excuse for the Reim Empire to invade Magnostadt. After Aladdin and Alibaba stop Reim's invasion, Titus is allowed by Scheherazade to stay in Magnostadt with his friends, but reveals to him that he has few time left to live as with the impending death of the original Scheherazade, all her clones including him shall perish as well. Encouraged by Marga, Titus decides to make use of the little time he has left to protect her and the rest of his friends and confronts Mogamett by himself. At the expense of his life, Titus manages to bring Mogamett back to its senses, giving time for Alladin and Yamraiha to reach the chancellor's rukh after the medium is weakened enough by the Dungeon Capturers from Kou, Reim and the Alliance of Seven Seas. Once the battle is over, Titus is revived by Ugo and becomes the new Magi of Reim, inheriting not only Scheherazade's powers, but her knowledge as well.

 Captain of Reim's "Fanalis Corps", considered the greatest warrior in all the Empire. He is one of the Empire's three Dungeon Capturers. Like his sister, he is only half-Fanalis, being more weak physically than his pureblood companions. Mu and his companions lead the attack on Magnostadt, easily breaking through its defenses until being stopped and repelled by Aladdin and Alibaba, but later reappears to join them against the dark medium and stop it from destroying the world. Mu reappears later before Morgiana and reveals that just like her, he once traversed the great rift but instead of hearing Yunan's advice, he pushed forward, learning that the Fanalis are in fact not human with their true form only revealed once they meet with their fully transformed brethren. Like his father, Mu decided to keep his Djinn in order to protect the empire from an eventual attack from Nerva.
Barbatos
 A Djinn of hunting and nobility contained in Mu's sword that when fully equipped, transforms itself into a trident and empowers him and his household with strength magic capable of striking enemies at distance with powerful shockwaves. However, these vessels must be used with caution as Mu and his subordinates possess little Magoi to spend, due to their Fanalis ancestry.

 Son of the Reim Emperor and one of the Empire's three Dungeon Capturers. Owner of the djinn Shax, he was the only among Reim's Dungeon Capturers who had not mastered his Djinn Equip during the battle against Il Illah's medium. Once the International Alliance is established, Nerva refuses to abdicate from his Imperial privileges and, possibly under influence from other nobles, decides to defy Sinbad's decree to lay down all Metal Vessels and disappears without a trace, becoming a potential threat to Reim's political stability and forcing both Mu and his father to keep his Djinns as well in order to prepare against an eventual attack from him.

Supreme commander of the army. As one of the Empire's three Dungeon Capturers, he is the owner of the djinn Purson. Like his son, Ignatius decided to keep his Djinn in order to protect the empire from an eventual attack from Nerva.

 Myron is Mu's little sister and a member of the Fanalis Corps. Just like Lo'lo', she owns a household vessel empowered by her brother's djinn.

 Lo'lo' is a member of the Fanalis Corps and owner of household vessel "Bard Kauza". Somehow he lost part of his lips, leaving some teeth always exposed.

 Shambal is a member of the Yambala Gladiators, a clan of powerful warriors able to manipulate their Magoi to increase their prowess in battle. He passed his techniques to Sinbad, who lived with the Yambalas for a while and later becomes Alibaba's teacher upon his request.

 A young woman member of the Yambala who helps with Alibaba's training. Moved by his compassion and selflessness, she later reunites with Alibaba in Sindria and joins him and Morgiana in his diplomatic travel to Balbadd. She owns a large sword that later becomes a household vessel under Alibaba's Amon and eventually becomes Olba's girlfriend. During the three-year timeskip, they get married and have two children.

 An intelligence officer from Reim, he was sent to spy on Parthevia and upon being wounded, he is sheltered by Sinbad's father Badr, unaware of his true identity. During his stay he tells the young Sinbad several stories about the outside world and become close to him, until he is found out and takes Sinbad as a hostage in an attempt to escape and is killed by Badr.

Magnostadt
Formerly the Musta'sim Kingdom, it is a small nation founded and ruled by Magicians that has rapidly grown in size and power since its establishment due to its advanced magic research. It implements a caste system with most of the non-magician inhabitants living in poor conditions at the slums with their Magoi being slowly drained to power up the magic tools manufactured by the magicians. Backed up by Al-Thamen during the revolution to overthrow the kingdom, the magicians of Magnostadt were the ones who created the black metal vessels with black Rukh. Coveted by both the Reim and Kou Empire, Magnostadt ends up involved in a war against them to ensure its independence, which leaves the country in ruins. Assisted by the new united front formed by the Reim Empire and the Alliance of Seven Seas, Magnostadt manages to keep its independence and the caste system is abolished as the entire population joins the effort in rebuild it.

 The chancellor of Magnostadt's magic academy who started loathing non-magician humans (whom he labels as "Goi") due to all the suffering and prejudice caused upon magicians by the king and the nobility, which led to several tragedies including the death of his daughter. This led Mogamett to lead his fellow magicians in an uprising to take over the country leading it to its current status quo. Originally having an honest wish to make use of magic for the sake of all mankind, Mogamett's hatred toward the Goi led him to start viewing them as less than animals and that only magicians are worthy of his protection. At the sight of the bodies of his friends killed during the failed invasion by the Reim Empire and upon learning of an incoming invasion by the Kou Empire, Mogamett descends into Magnostadt's lowest sector where a huge mass of Black Rukh is stored, which he uses to continuously summon Dark Djinns to destroy the invaders, falling into depravity in the process until Aladdin and Yamraiha manage to reach him with Solomon's Wisdom. After assuming his mistakes, Mogamett's Rukh finally returns to the Great Flow but not before asking Aladdin to look for a way to the souls of those who suffered because of him also find peace as well. By the request of his disciples, Mogamett's scepter is entrusted to Aladdin.

 A sick orphan whose condition went terminal due to the constant drain of Magoi from her body. She is adopted by Titus who grows attached to her and uses his magic to prolong her life. She leaves Magnostadt to live with Titus in Reim after he becomes Scheherazade's successor.

 A High Class Magician of Magnostadt who teaches Rukh's Properties and Alterations in the academy. She dedicates herself to research the several properties of Black Rukh, but seem to be unaware of the dark secret behind its creation. She has a large admiration on Mogamett, to the point of getting envious of Aladdin when he becomes closer to the chancellor.

 Myers, the Thunder Whip Magician, is a teacher at the Magnostadt Academy, who helps Aladdin with his remedial classes when he is mistakenly labeled as a dropout due to his inability to generate much Magoi by himself when not assisted by external Rukh. She used to be a magician of the Parthevia Empire like her brother Doron.

 Doron is Myers' little brother. He is a magician responsible to enforce order in the 5th level district, where live the unemployed non-magicians of Magnustadt, which represent two-thirds of the city's population, treating them with scorn.

Parthevia Empire
The birthland of Sinbad and his comrade Drakon. It was originally a small and prosperous nation which expanded its territory and influence, increasing its prosperity until getting into difficulties upon facing the much stronger Reim Empire.

Sinbad's father and a war veteran who lost his left leg in combat. Despite being offered a huge sum in reward for his effort in the war and to compensate the loss of his leg, he refuses it instead, claiming that he did nothing worthy of earning it. He used to live peacefully working as a fisherman with his wife and son until the country started losing ground against Reim, and his refusal to take part in the war effort led him to be shunned by his friends and neighbors, who brand him and his family as expatriates. Badr eventually join the war to protect his family but before leaving, he shows his wounded and crippled body claiming it is the only "reward" he got from war. He is then accused of treason and executed.

Sinbad's mother who was ill by the time her son left to conquer his first dungeon when he was only 14 years old, carrying a sword from his father. She dies at her son's arms just after he returns home, as despite Sinbad stayed inside Baal for only a few hours, two months had passed in the outside world.

The first princess of Parthevia and commander of the army, known as the "Venomous Spider Princess of Parthevia". She and Drakon were close friends since childhood and she makes him promise to return alive from his expedition to conquer Baal. When Drakon returns defeated and injured by Sinbad, she vows to hunt him down, but fails to defeat him when they finally meet, and he leaves the country to start his journey. Serendine is then betrothed to Barbarossa, until Drakon appears to reveal his brother's betrayal and help her escape. During the expedition to conquer the dungeon Zepar, Serendine offers her hand in marriage to Sinbad in order to have him accepted as the rightful king of Parthevia, earning the allegiance of Zepar in the occasion. According to Sinbad, Serendine died when the First Kingdom of Sindria was destroyed by Parthevia.
Zepar
A djinn of spirit and puppetry, Zepar was originally captured by Serendine, and transferred to Sinbad when he absorbed her Rukh following her death. It was contained into Serendine's sword until then.

Drakon's older brother and a general of the army, he is engaged with Serendine only for political reasons and is backed up by Al-Thamen, who help him obtain his djinn. After Drakon fails to conquer both the Baal and Valefor dungeons, Barbarossa contacts his brother and claims that he has no need for him anymore, betraying him and ordering his death. Barbarossa confronts his brother again and deals him a mortal blow with his djinn equip, before Drakon gains a new body through assimilation. He had two Djinn in his possession and both returned to their respective dungeons after he is killed by Sinbad.
Glasya-Labolas
 A djinn of massacre and arrogance, it is capable of powerful gravity magic and is contained in Barbarossa's halberd.
Gusion
 A djinn capable of powerful earth magic, strong enough to affect the planet's tectonic plates. Barbarossa used its power to attack the first kingdom of Sindria.

Al-Thamen
The main antagonist faction,  is an organization that existed since immemorial times, working in the shadows to spread out what Sinbad labels as the "Abnormalities of the World", like famine, war, prejudice and oppression, bringing chaos and turmoil to the world with the intention to break the guidance of the Rukh, which according to them, renders people subjects to their fates. Throughout history, they had infiltrated several countries, interfering negatively in their societies with the pretense of providing assistance to them. Most of Al Thamen's agents are in fact artificial beings, each created from a hollow Matryoshka-like object whose true form is revealed when defeated.

According to Aladdin, the organization was responsible for the event that caused the destruction of mankind's previous world, Alma Torran, by summoning the corrupt god "Ill Ilah" and intends to do so in the current world as well. To accomplish that, it is necessary to gather a huge amount of Black Rukh in one place, thus their efforts to ensure that more and more people fall into depravity. After Sinbad establishes the International Alliance and Arba joins forces with him, they start focusing on obtaining access to the "Golden Palace", claiming that they intend to turn Sinbad into the ultimate king, but they actually intend to fuse him with "Ill Ilah".

 

After conspiring to murder her husband, causing a fire that also claimed the life of Hakuryuu and Hakuei's brothers, she marries her brother-in-law who becomes the second emperor and after his death, she claims the throne for herself under suspicious circumstances. Later it is revealed that she was one of the three Magi who served under Solomon. Arba originally was created as Solomon's servant and knew him since his birth. They shared a close bond, but due to her being his servant, she felt obliged to address him more formally. However, Solomon did not approve of this, and would constantly scold her for it after their escape from the church. She later convinces Sheba to marry Solomon while she claims will remain beside him only as a protector, to defend him from all enemies, no matter the means used for it. However, she turned on her master when he decided to share the energy of God with all creatures, humans and non-humans alike, leading her to establish Al-Thamen and stage a revolt in Alma-Torran and cause its ruin by staging the descent of "Ill Ilah". Gyokuen is defeated and beheaded by Hakuryuu, with Judar's help, but while it appears that she was defeated for good, Arba reappears, possessing Hakuei's body. In another clash with Hakuryuu, Arba reveals that she passes her spirit from mother to daughter as bodies with her blood are compatible with her Rukh, which gives him and his allies an idea to defeat her for good. Aladdin uses alchemical magic to modify Hakuei's body and expel her Rukh, which returns to her original body.

 A Magi working on Al-Thamen's behest as the oracle of the Kou Empire. Specialized in Ice Magic, Judar's power grow stronger when surrounded by Black Rukh as a result of having fallen into depravity. He was raised by Al-Thamen after the organization killed his parents to kidnap him, but even after Aladdin reveals it to him with the Wisdom of Solomon, he claims that it does not matter to him, but this is proven wrong when he is confronted by the djinn Belial and reveals that his true objective is to get back at the world for allowing such tragedy to happen to him, and to do such he betrays Al-Thamen and joins forces with Hakuryuu instead. By absorbing the Black Rukh from the destroyed medium at Magnostadt, Judar not only increases his magic power considerably, but also gains access to the knowledge of all the magicians who died to form it, including Mogamett himself, allowing him to continuously learn from it.

A former princess of the Musta'sim Kingdom, she joins Al-Thamen after her family is killed in a revolution orchestrated by Magnostadt. Specialized in gravity and magnetic magic, she fights along a doll created by her based on her long lost servant Isaac. She ambushes Aladdin and his friends inside Zagan's dungeon and is defeated after becoming a black djinn with a black metal vessel. Despite Yamraiha's efforts to heal her, Dunya dies soon after by the aftereffects of the transformation.

Isaac was Dunya's servant at the Musta'sim Kingdom who died to protect her during Mogamett's revolution. She later uses her magic to construct a doll resembling him to fight at her side.

 An agent of Al-Thamen who first confronts Aladdin and his friends in the Zagan dungeon. When his head is cut by Alibaba, it transforms itself in a snake and transfers himself into Hakuryuu's arm when he bites it. He manages to infiltrate in Sindria when he emanates from Hakuryu's arm, which is cut from him. He ends up defeated by Sinbad. Later it is revealed that it was Ithnan who approached Mogamett and helped Magnostadt to assume control of the Musta'sim Kingdom. Originally, Ithnan lived in Alma Torran and was member of Solomon's resistance.

Originally a member of Solomon's party in Alma Torran, Falan was also Wahid's wife and mother to their son, but just like Ithnan, she later reappears as a member of Al-Thamen, backing Barbarossa's plan to seize the throne of Parthevia and sending assassins to kill Sinbad.

Member of Solomon's resistance, he was also Falan's husband. After their only son is killed by David, he betrays Solomon alongside Ithnan, Falan and Arba. He was fatally injured protecting Falan, so he sacrificed himself to become the Medium of Ill Ilah, sealing Alma Torran's fate. He later makes an appearance in Ill Illah’s dimension when Alibaba gets sent to it after getting cut by Hakuryuu’s djinn, Belial.

 Member of a trio of agents sent by Al-Thamen. While in the manga they appear in Torran to ambush Aladdin and his friends after they conquer Zagan, in the anime they break into Sindria after Judar destroys the magic barrier protecting it. A huge and muscular man who claims to not discriminate against women, thus has the habit of not holding back against them, although he admits an aversion to fighting men. He is confronted and killed by Masrur.

 Another member of the trio sent by Al-Thamen. A short old man in a wheelchair capable of powerful destructive magic powered by his dark metal vessel. He is confronted and killed by Yamraiha.

 The third member of trio sent by Al-Thamen. A tall and thin man using a rapier-like Dark Metal Vessel to create doppelgangers from his shadow, he also proves to be a very capable swordsman being almost at Sharrkan's level but ends up defeated by him.

 An agent of the Al-Thamen who works as Balbadd's financial advisor, with the name 'Banker'. With the pretense of helping Balbadd to prosper, he convinces King Abhmad to continuously borrow money from the Kou Empire which snowballs into a huge debt and the loss of its economic independence, ultimately leading to its annexation to the Empire.

 An agent of the Al-Thamen who supplied magic weapons to Cassim and his fellow members of the 'Fog Troupe' with the intention of further increasing chaos in Balbadd. He is destroyed by Sinbad in the manga, but in the anime he transforms into a snake and poisons Alibaba, and later Sinbad, contaminating them with the Black Rukh with the intention of having both fall into depravity before disappearing.

Alma Torran

Solomon was Aladdin's father and the king of Alma Torran, another world that was destroyed ages before by an unknown catastrophic event and the creator of the current world. 800 years after mankind rose into power thanks to god bestowing them the gift of magic, Solomon organized a resistance movement against the orthodox magicians who used their power to oppress the other species and put them under their control, eventually leading to him uniting all the world under his peaceful rule.

Rescued by Solomon when she was 12, Sheba learned his beliefs that all species are equal and joins his effort to free the non-humans from the Orthodox's control. She later becomes one of the three Magi under Solomon. She also becomes Solomon's lover and gets pregnant with his child, Aladdin. However, she is betrayed and mortally injured by Arba, but before expiring, she entrusts unborn Aladdin to Ugo who raises him.

 First seen as a djinn, Ugo is the keeper of the Sacred Temple and despite not being contracted with Aladdin, it can be summoned by his flute. Although he has a huge body, his head is in a different space. Hence, his head does not come out from the flute. Although it is unclear of what his powers are, he specializes in hand-in-hand combat when he is materialized. He also uses heat magic in both of his hands to deliver a deadly blow when faced with a formidable enemy. He has an extremely shy personality, causing him to blush profusely whenever a girl touches him. In order to overcome this weakness, he becomes used to being touched by Morgiana. Ugo's body is ultimately destroyed while fighting Kougyoku, with his living head still residing at the sacred temple. Later he summons Aladdin's spirit to the Sacred Temple to entrust him with the "Wisdom of Solomon" before bidding farewell to him. Later it is revealed that Ugo originally was called  and was part of Solomon's original party that rose against mankind oppression of other species in Alma Torran. Ugo was a magic genius who has theorized and created many Magic Tools and Magics when he was in Alma Torran, like a flying vessel and Solomon's magics. He was the leader for the constructors of Magic Theories since the foundation of the Magician Orthodox. He was even the one that discovered the Rukh and it properties.

Another member of Solomon's resistance, Setta was raised on the same church as Ithnan and treated him like a brother. He was killed by David, and his death is what caused Ithnan to fall into depravity and join Al-Thamen.

The main antagonist of the series who is Aladdin's grandfather and leader of the Orthodox magicians, the first Singularity who lived for 800 years before his son Solomon overthrew him. But David foresaw the event along with future events beyond the fall of Alma Torran, allowing himself to be killed by Solomon while warning his son to not see what fate has in store for him. In his final moments, David merged his being into the entity Ill Ilah and later placed an extension of himself into Sinbad's body. David later manifests himself to aid Sinbad in subduing Ugo and aid the human in his plan to send all souls back to the Rukh, only to take control of Sacred Place after Aladdin managed to dissuade Sinbad. David attempts to absorb the Rukh into himself before he is ultimately destroyed by Sinbad, Aladdin, and his companions along with the Rukh system.

Other characters

 He is the last of the four Magi introduced in the story, who is affiliated with no faction, although it is hinted that his chosen King Candidate was Sinbad, whom he befriended several years before, but they are not currently seeing eye to eye. The first dungeon "Baal", which was conquered by Sinbad is one of many dungeons created by Yunan before he disappears without a trace. His current whereabouts are revealed when Morgiana meets him inside the Great Rift that splits the Dark Continent in two, where he reveals to her that with the death of the second Kou Emperor, Koutoku Ren, a great war is about to begin in the world. During the battle of Magnostadt, Yunan joins the fight after he and Morgiana ask for Sinbad's help. Yunan later reveals to Aladdin that he had reincarnated nine times, in preparation to counter Al-Thamen's plans to destroy the world and every time one of his previous lives ended, he had met Ugo before his following life began. Yunan is the one who took care of Alibaba’s body after his death. He fights Arba in the final arc, and also helps kill David with Sinbad and Aladdin.

 Madaura chronologically first appears in Adventure of Sinbad as the owner of the "Mariadel Trading Company", a prosperous slave trade company in Reim, using mind tricks and torture to make young children as her loyal slaves. She lays a trap for Sinbad to become one of her slaves, and after breaking his mind and spirit, she puts him in charge of handling the other slaves until he breaks free from her control. After Sinbad's friends from the Sindria Trading Company get the best of her with their own scheme, she is left with a massive debt, and is forced to relinquish all her assets to them, including Sinbad, Masrur and all the other slaves under hers, which Sinbad set free, thus leaving her bankrupt.
 She is introduced in the main series as the owner of the magic tool "Holy Mother Halo Fan" which has the ability to put all children (and teenagers to a certain degree) under her control by having them believe she is their mother. She leads a pirate crew composed solely of children enticed by the fan, including some kidnapped from nearby cities. She is confronted by Aladdin, Alibaba, Morgiana and Hakuryuu who defeat her crew until she attacks them with the fan. While Hakuryuu is the most affected due to his conflicted story with his mother, Aladdin is not affected at all, because he does not remember much of his. In the end, Aum Madaura is captured and beheaded by Hakuryuu before the children who mourn her death and swear to avenge her, having trouble to return to their parents for being still under the fan's effects.

 First appearing as a member of Aum Madaura's crew, he is rescued by Alibaba and his friends and sent to live in Sindria. After the battle of Magnostadt, it is revealed that he was studying swordsmanship under Sharrkan and has grown much taller in a short period of time. When Alibaba departs to Balbadd to rendezvous with Kouen Ren, he and his companions decide to accompany him. During the trip, Olba becomes a member of Alibaba's household and Toto's boyfriend. During the three-year timeskip, they get married and have two children.

References

Magi: The Labyrinth of Magic